The Norfolk mayoral election of 2014 took place on May 7, 2014. Voters elected the Mayor of Norfolk. It saw the reelection of incumbent mayor Paul D. Fraim.

Results

References 
 

2014 Virginia elections
2014 United States mayoral elections
2014